Down to the Sea in Ships was released in 1956 as a 33 RPM album under the Decca record label. Burl Ives and the Ralph Hunter Singers perform classic sea shanties.

Reception 

Allmusic critic Bruce Eder wrote: "Some of it may sound hokey in the 21st century, but in 1956 this was as close to authenticity as most listeners ever got, and it is still compelling listening, if one suspends his disbelief (which Ives makes it easy to do). What's more, the range of material speaks volumes about the sincerity of the effort involved, which may overcome some of the sense of artifice that one finds in records of this sort a half-century or more on."

Track listing

Side one 
"Jack Was Every Inch a Sailor" – 2:43
"Santy Anna" – 2:34
"The Eddystone Light" – 1:17
"Haul Away, Joe" – 3:27
"You New York Girls" – 2:12
"The Sailor's Grave" – 2:51
"Leave Her, Johnny, Leave Her" – 1:21
"Away Rio" – 2:35
"Ben Backstay" – 3:02

Side two 
"Wrap Me Up in My Tarpaulin Jacket" –  2:33
"Blow Ye Winds" – 2:30
"Go Down You Red Red Roses" – 2:40
"Hullabaloo Belay" – 1:13
"Stormalong" – 2:46
"The Drunken Sailor" – 2:17
"Highland Laddie" – 3:19
"The Golden Vanity" – 3:08
"Rolling Home" – 2:26

References 

1956 albums
Burl Ives albums
Decca Records albums
Sea shanties albums